Mangrovispora is a genus of fungi within the order Phyllachorales. The relationship of this taxon to other taxa within the class is unknown (incertae sedis).

References

Sordariomycetes genera
Phyllachorales